Amer Omar Mohammad Abu Hudaib (born August 21, 1993) is a Jordanian footballer who plays as a defender for Al-Ramtha and the Jordan national football team.

International career
Abu Hudieab's first international match with the Jordan national senior team was against Trinidad and Tobago on 16 June 2015 at Irbid in an international friendly. The match had ended in a 3–0 win.

International career statistics

References

External links 
 
 whoscored.com 
 soccerpunter.com
 

1993 births
Living people
Jordanian footballers
Jordan international footballers
Footballers at the 2014 Asian Games
Al-Jazeera (Jordan) players
Al-Ramtha SC players
Al-Faisaly SC players
Jordanian Pro League players
Association football defenders
Sportspeople from Amman
Asian Games competitors for Jordan